The AA battery (or double-A battery) is a standard size single cell cylindrical dry battery. The IEC 60086 system calls the size R6, and ANSI C18 calls it 15. It is named UM-3 by JIS of Japan. Historically, it is known as D14 (hearing aid battery), U12 – later U7 (standard cell), or HP7 (for zinc chloride 'high power' version) in official documentation in the United Kingdom, or a pen cell.

AA batteries are common in portable electronic devices. An AA battery is composed of a single electrochemical cell that may be either a primary battery (disposable) or a rechargeable battery. Several different chemistries are used in their construction. The exact terminal voltage, capacity and practical discharge rates depend on cell chemistry; however, devices designed for AA cells will usually only take 1.2–1.5 V unless specified by the manufacturer.

Introduced in 1907 by The American Ever Ready Company, the AA battery size was standardized by the American National Standards Institute (ANSI) in 1947, but it had been in use in flashlights and electrical novelties before formal standardization. ANSI and IEC battery nomenclature gives several designations for cells in this size, depending on cell features and chemistry.  Due to their popularity in small flashlights, they are often called "penlight batteries".

Dimensions 

The positive terminal button should be a minimum 1 mm high and a maximum 5.5 mm in diameter, the flat negative terminal should be a minimum diameter of 7 mm. 14500 Lithium Batteries are longer if they feature a protection circuit up to 53 mm.

Chemistry and capacity

Primary cells 
Primary (non-rechargeable) zinc–carbon (dry cell) AA batteries have around 400–900 milliampere hours capacity, with measured capacity highly dependent on test conditions, duty cycle, and cut-off voltage. Zinc–carbon batteries are usually marketed as "general purpose" batteries. Zinc-chloride batteries store around 1,000 to 1,500 mAh are often sold as "heavy duty" or "super heavy duty". Alkaline batteries from 1,700 mAh to 2,850 mAh cost more than zinc-chloride batteries, but hold additional charge. AA size alkaline batteries are termed as LR06 by IEC, and AM-3 by JIS.

Non-rechargeable lithium iron disulfide batteries are manufactured for devices that draw more current, such as digital cameras, where their high cost is offset by longer running time between battery changes and more constant voltage during discharge. The capacity of alkaline batteries is greatly reduced as the discharge current increases, however the capacity of a Li-FeS2 battery is not affected by high discharge currents nearly as much as alkaline batteries. Another advantage of lithium disulfide batteries compared to alkaline batteries is that they are less prone to leak. This is particularly important in expensive equipment, where a leaking alkaline battery can damage the equipment due to the corrosive electrolyte coming into contact with sensitive electronics. Lithium iron disulfide batteries are intended for use in equipment compatible with alkaline zinc batteries. Lithium-iron disulfide batteries can have an open-circuit voltage as high as 1.8 volts, but the closed-circuit voltage decreases, making this chemistry compatible with equipment intended for zinc-based batteries. A fresh alkaline zinc battery can have an open-circuit voltage of 1.6 volts, but a lithium iron disulfide battery with an open-circuit voltage below 1.7 volts is entirely discharged.

Rechargeable cells 

Rechargeable batteries in the AA size are available in multiple chemistries:
nickel–cadmium (NiCd) with a capacity of roughly 600–1,000 mAh, nickel–metal hydride (NiMH) in various capacities of 600–2,750 mAh and lithium-ion. NiCd and NIMH provide 1.2 V; lithium-ion chemistry has a nominal voltage of 3.6–3.7 volts, and AA-sized cells of this voltage are coded 14500 rather than AA. AA-sized lithium-ion cells with circuitry to reduce the voltage to the 1.5V of standard replaceable cells are also made.

NiMH and lithium-ion AA/14500 cells can supply most of their capacity even when under a high current drain (0.5A and higher), unlike alkaline and zinc-chloride ("Heavy Duty"/"Super Heavy Duty") cells which drop to a small fraction of their low current capacity before even reaching 1 C.

Li-ion
A Li-ion 1.5V AA-size battery, sold by the Chinese company Kentli as "Kentli PH5" since 2014 and with similar batteries later available from other suppliers, is an AA-sized battery housing containing a rechargeable 3.7 V Li-ion cell  with an internal buck converter at the positive electrode to reduce the output voltage to 1.5 V. The Kentli batteries expose the normal 3.7 V Li-ion electrode in a ring around the AA electrode to allow charging by a special charger. It supplies the same 1.5 V as a fresh disposable alkaline AA cell, but with virtually no droop over the discharge cycle, unlike other disposable or rechargeable  cells. Its lithium-ion chemistry provides a low self-discharge of 3% per month. Its capacity at 250 mA drain is 1,700 mAh at 1.5 V, less than other chemistries, limited by the low efficiency of the step-down converter. Some later Li-ion AA batteries advertise their capacity in milliwatt-hours (mWh) instead of the usual milliampere-hours (mAh), so a customer's attention is drawn to the figure, typically a claimed 3,000 or more, which is in reality 2,000mAh.

By 2023 several brands of 1.5 V Li-ion rechargeable batteries in both AA and AAA sizes (with voltage converting circuitry in even the small AAA casing) were available in 2023. They use various charging methods, without the special Kentli ring third electrode. Some have special chargers—a charger for a 1.2 V cell will not provide sufficient voltage—but do not use a third electrode. Others have a USB port built into the cell itself.

NiZn
Nickel-zinc cell (NiZn) rechargeable 1.65 V AA and AAA cells are also available, but not widely used. They require a charging circuit capable of supplying that voltage.

Comparison

Use 
In 2011, AA cells accounted for approximately 60% of alkaline battery sales in the United States. In Japan, 58% of alkaline batteries sold were AA, known in that country as tansan (単三). In Switzerland, AA batteries totaled 55% in both primary and secondary (rechargeable) battery sales.

See also 
 List of battery sizes
 Battery nomenclature

References

External links 
 
 Datasheet for Energizer alkaline AA battery (E91)
 Datasheet for Energizer lithium AA battery (L91)
 Datasheet for Duracell alkaline AA battery (MN1500)

Battery shapes